Pavel Nikolayevich Zhagun (Russian: Павел Николаевич Жагун; born May 22, 1954 in Chelyabinsk, Russia) is a Russian poet, musician, record producer, artist, and curator. Zhagun was raised in Ukraine and graduated from R.M. Glier Kiev Institute of Music as a trumpet player.

Career 
Between 1970 and 1980 he worked in various symphonic and jazz bands: from 1971 to 1975 in the progressive jazz-rock band Bells, from 1974 to 1976 in the Ukrainian Radio & Television Symphony Orchestra, the bands Charivny Gitary and Krasnye Maki and was concertmaster of Georgian State Jazz Orchestra. In the 1980s Pavel played in the band (Alla Pugacheva).
Since the late 1980s he worked on solo industrial-noise projects and produced several indie-bands.

During 1988–1989 Zhagun founded and produced the bands Scandal and Moral Codex. He continues to work with Moral Codex.

During 1991–92 Pavel participated in a number of Russian post-industrial electronic projects, Atomic Biscuit Orchestra, Joint Committee and F.R.U.I.T.S. (with Alexei Borisov). Since 2000 he wrote music for films, such as 24 Часа by Alexander Atanesyan) and art performances, working as a curator of Khankhalaev Gallery and began painting and creating graphic works. Zhagun is currently living in Moscow and owns the 0˚ internet record label. His current solo electronic music project is called Piezo.

Literary career 
 2007 – Zhagun published avant-garde poems and prose, which he had written since the middle of the 1970s and released a book of poems "Radiolarias" – Vodoley Publishers.
 2008 – book of poems "IN4" – Pushkin Fund publishing.
 2008 – Pavel became organizer and a participant of an annual festival of sound-art and contemporary poetry "Poetronica".
 2009 – book of poems "Scarlet Letter of Speed" – Pushkin Fund publishing.
 2009 – Pavel was short-listed for Andrei Bely Prize.
 2009 — novel-transformer "Kaliostro's Dust" – published by Argo-Risk and Knizhnoe Obozrenie.
 2010 – book of poems "Carte Blanche" – published by Argo-Risk and Knizhnoe Obozrenie.

Discography 
 2011 – "SILF" – Nostress Netlabel
 2010 — "ARTIFICATION" — Rhizomatique 
 2009 — "4444" – 0˙Records
 2008 — "Xaioiax" — Koyuki Records 
 2005 — "BRUT" — 0˙Records
 2001 — "Music for Machines" — Exotica Records
 2001 — "Lighting Ice Generator" — V/A "Tell Tchaikovsky The News Vol. 3" Exotica Lights
 2001 — "Stepindustria" — V/A "Tell Tchaikovsky The News Vol. 2" Exotica Lights
 1999 — "Blue Fluff On The Black Hat" — V/A "Tell Tchaikovsky The News" Exotica Lights
 1999 — "Aquasonic" Live CD-R Noart Records
 1996 — "Magnetto" — Noart Records
 1996 — "Celluloid Solution" — V/A "Transsiberian Express" Purple Legion
 1992 — "Xenomania" — CD-R Noart Records
 1991 — "Toxic Tranzistor" — CD-R Noart Records
 1991 — "Dead Fish And Luminous Air" — CD-R Noart Records
 1990 — "Toyz Of The Noize" — CD-R Noart Records
 1989 — "Noisereconstruction" — CD-R Noart Records
 1988 — "Moto 2000" — 0˙Records
 1987 — "Rubber Japan" — 0˙Records
 1986 — "Honey Phosphorus" — 0˙Records
 1985 — "Clorox of molecule" — 0˙Record
 1984 — "Glass Idol" — 0˙Records

Selected discography of F.R.U.I.T.S. 
 1997 — "Elektrostatic" (Exotica Records)
 1998 – F.R.U.I.T.S. & Sa-Zna "Amber Rooms" (CD) (Exotica Records / GMB R&I, Russia)
 2000 – Acid report 1996 (CD-R, Grief recordings)
 2000 – Studio recordings 1992–1993 vol.1 (CD-R, N&B research digest)
 2001 – Jakuzi (CD, Exotica Records)
 2001 – "Lakmus" (CD-R, Xerxes rec., Japan)
 2004 – "Forbidden Beat" (CD, Laton, Austria)

References

External links 
 Official site
 MySpace profile

1954 births
Living people
21st-century Russian poets
21st-century male writers
Russian male poets
Russian jazz musicians
Russian record producers